Great Massingham is a village and civil parish in the English county of Norfolk.
It has a primary school (including a pre-school in the grounds), a village shop, a pub (Dabbling Duck), a village hall and a church (St Mary's). There is also a sports club,  the Great Massingham Tennis and Multi-sports club. The village is notable for the number of ponds: two large ones in the village centre and more in the outskirts. The number of ducks has led for the logo of the school to show one.

The village's name means "homestead/village of Maessa's people".

See also
 RAF Great Massingham
 Little Massingham

Notes 

http://kepn.nottingham.ac.uk/map/place/Norfolk/Great%20Massingham

External links

Villages in Norfolk
King's Lynn and West Norfolk
Civil parishes in Norfolk